Chetogena is a genus of flies in the family Tachinidae.

Species
C. acuminata Rondani, 1859
C. alpestris Tschorsnig, 1997
C. arnaudi (Reinhard, 1956)
C. claripennis (Macquart, 1848)
C. clunalis (Reinhard, 1956)
C. edwardsii (Williston, 1889)
C. fasciata (Egger, 1856)
C. filipalpis Rondani, 1859
C. floridensis (Townsend, 1916)
C. gelida (Coquillett, 1897)
C. gynaephorae Chao & Shi, 1987
C. indivisa (Aldrich and Webber, 1924)
C. innocens (Wiedemann, 1830)
C. lophyri (Townsend, 1892)
C. mageritensis (Villeneuve & Mesnil, 1936)
C. media Rondani, 1859
C. micronychia (Masson, 1969)
C. nigrofasciata (Strobl, 1902)
C. obliquata (Fallén, 1810)
C. omissa (Reinhard, 1934)
C. paradoxa (Brauer & von Bergenstamm, 1893)
C. raoi Mesnil, 1968
C. rondaniana (Villeneuve, 1931)
C. scutellaris (Wulp, 1890)
C. sellersi (Hall, 1939)
C. siciliensis (Villeneuve, 1924)
C. subnitens (Aldrich and Webber, 1924)
C. tachinomoides (Townsend, 1892)
C. tschorsnigi Ziegler, 1999
C. tuomuerensis Chao & Shi, 1987
C. tuomurensis Chao, 1985
C. tuomurensis Chao, 1985
C. vibrissata (Brauer and Bergenstamm, 1891)

References

Tachinidae genera
Exoristinae
Taxa named by Camillo Rondani